Paul Breslin (born 2 October 1946) is a Scottish retired amateur footballer who played outside left in the Scottish League for Queen's Park. He was capped by Scotland at the amateur level.

References

Scottish footballers
Scottish Football League players
Queen's Park F.C. players
Association football outside forwards
Scotland amateur international footballers
1946 births
Living people
Footballers from Glasgow